Shaikh Hussain Jalayir (died April or May 1382) was a Jalayirid ruler (1374–1382). He was the son of Shaikh Awais Jalayir. Following the execution of his brother Shaikh Hasan Jalayir, the amirs placed Shaikh Hussain Jalayir on the throne. Almost immediately he had to deal with an invasion by his brother-in-law Shah Mahmud of the Muzaffarids of Iran. Shah Mahmud, who was the son-in-law of Shaikh Awais Jalayir, advanced a claim on Tabriz and took the city. Illness, however, forced him to abandon the region. This was followed by an invasion by the leader of the Muzaffarids, Shah Shuja, but despite taking the city, he was also forced to retreat due to a rebellion in Qazvin. It was only in the summer of 1376 that Shaikh Hussain Jalayir took up residence in Tabriz. In the following spring, he undertook a successful campaign against the Black Sheep Turkmen under Bairam Khwaja, who had been raiding from the west.

Shaikh Hussain Jalayir's reign was marred by conflict with his surviving brothers; namely, Shaikh Ali Jalayir, Sultan Ahmed Jalayir, and Shaikh Bayazid Jalayir. Shaikh Hussain Jalayir also lost his popularity among many amirs who disliked his support of the powerful 'Adil Aqa, the governor of Ray. Shaikh Hussain Jalayir was faced with a series of uprisings, hostility among his brothers, and troubles with his external enemies. When 'Adil Aqa turned on him, Shaikh Hussain Jalayir lost his last powerful supporter. Sultan Ahmed Jalayir advanced from Ardabil and occupied Tabriz near the end of April 1382; he ordered Husain's execution. Ahmad would then himself take the throne, but conflict between him and 'Adil Aqa and Bayazid meant that the state fell into a period of disunity.

References
Peter Jackson (1986). The Cambridge History of Iran, Volume Six: The Timurid and Safavid Periods.  
Edward G. Browne (1926). A Literary History of Persia: The Tartar Dominion. 

1382 deaths
Jalayirids
Year of birth unknown